Gary Grubbs (born November 14, 1949) is an American character actor who has appeared in 178 credited shows and films since the 1970s and is still working steadily. He is best known as Captain Steven Wiecek in For Love and Honor (1983-1984), Harlin in Will & Grace (1998-1999), and Mr. Dummont in Common Law (2012).

Career 
A veteran character actor, Grubbs has amassed over 170 film and television credits since 1977. His best known roles include attorney Al Oser in Oliver Stone's JFK, boatyard owner Phil Beasley in Gone Fishin', Timothy McReady in Double Take, Coach Ralph Miller in Glory Road, the Chief of Police in Bad Lieutenant: Port of Call New Orleans, and Dr. Kemp Clark in Parkland. He appeared as George Russell on The Wonderful World of Disney's 1988 miniseries "Davy Crockett: Rainbow in the Thunder" starring Tim Dunigan.

In the 1990s, Grubbs landed two notable (albeit short-lived) recurring television roles. On Growing Pains, he played George Brower, Luke Brower's (Leonardo DiCaprio) long-lost father, and during the first two seasons of Will & Grace, he played Harlin Polk, Will Truman's (Eric McCormack) number-one client. He also played Cal Stephens, a car dealer who sold Al Bundy a lemon, on Married... with Children.

In the 2001 film Double Take, Grubbs played the role of CIA agent Timothy Jarret McReady. He appeared in the recurring role of Gordon Bullit on the final season of The O.C.

Grubbs also made a cameo on a few episodes of the WB series Angel as Fred's father, Roger Burkle. He had a recurring role on Treme as Richard Desautel, father of chef Janette Desautel (Kim Dickens). In 2012, he appeared in an episode of Criminal Minds as Detective Oren Carr. He currently teaches acting classes.

Selected filmography

1970s 

 For the Love of Benji (1977) as Hank
 Deadman's Curve (1978) as Lead Singer
 From Here to Eternity (1979) as Pvt. Earl Krebes
 Charlie's Angels (1979, 1 episode) as Second Driver

1980s 

 Condominium (1980) as First Meteorologist
 The Rockford Files (1980, 1 episode) as Deputy Murray
 Gideon's Trumpet (1980) as Hamilton
 Hill Street Blues (1981, 1 episode) as Trevor Earps
 The Waltons (1981, 1 episode) as Job Moonie
 The Greatest American Hero (1981, 1 episode) as Doyle Casco
 Happy Days (1982, 1 episode) as Jack
 The Border (1982) as Honk
 CHiPs (1982, 1 episode) as Bo
 M*A*S*H (1982, 1 episode) as Lt. Geyer
 The Dukes of Hazzard (1982, 1 episode) as Wade
 Honkytonk Man (1982) as Jim Bob
 Knots Landing (1983) as Salesman
 Three's Company (1983) as Harry
 Silkwood (1983) as Randy Fox
 For Love and Honor (1983–84, 12 episodes) as Captain Steven Wiecek
 The Burning Bed (1984) as District Attorney Herzog
 Fatal Vision (1984) as James Blackburn
 Magnum, P.I. (1984, 1 episode) as Dexter
 Half Nelson (1985, 6 episodes) as Detective Hamil
 The A-Team (1986, 1 episode) as Sheriff Hopkins
 The Golden Girls (1986, 1 episode) as Waiter
 North and South: Book II (1986, 1 episode) as Lt. Pickles
 T. J. Hooker (1986, 1 episode) as Harlan Walker
 Silver Spoons (1986, 1 episode) as Billy
 Matlock (1987, 1 episode) as Reverend S.J. Sweet
 Poker Alice (1987) as Marshal McLean
 Nadine (1987) as Cecil
 Foxfire (1987) as Prince
 And God Created Woman (1988) as Officer Rupert Willis
 227 (1988, 1 episode) as Chester Jenkins
 Walt Disney's Wonderful World of Color (1988–89, 4 episodes) as George Russell
 Family Ties (1989, 1 episode) as Burt
 Guns of Paradise (1989, 1 episode) as Burt
 Tennessee Waltz (1989) as District Attorney

1990s 

 Hunter (1990, 1 episode) as Paul Brisco
 Major Dad (1990, 1 episode) as Maj. Buddy Hargrove
 Hull High (1990, 2 episodes) as Mr. Brawley
 Murder, She Wrote (1990, 1 episode) as Mark Berringer
 Evening Shade (1991, 1 episode) as Dean
 Without Warning: The James Brady Story (1991) as Larry Speakes
 JFK (1991) as Al Oser
 Growing Pains (1991–92, 2 episodes) as George Brower
 L.A. Law (1992) as U.S. Marshal William Hopson
 The Ernest Green Story (1993) as Mr. Loomis
 Telling Secrets (1993) as Det. Ron Taylor
 Miracle Child (1993) as John Marshall
 The Positively True Adventures of the Alleged Texas Cheerleader-Murdering Mom (1993) as Detective Helton
 Time Trax (1993, 1 episode) as Elton Travis
 North and South: Book III (1986, 3 episode) as Lt. Pickles
 Midnight Runaround (1994) as Lester Keating
 The X-Files (1995, 1 episode) as Sheriff Tom Arens
 The Stranger Beside Me (1995) as Chief Engineer
 Land's End (1995, 1 episode) as Walter Abbott/Joe Phillips
 Dave's World (1995, 1 episode) as Officer Bailey
 Second Noah (1996, 1 episode) as David Cooper
 Forgotten Sins (1996) as Reverend Ralph Newton
 Boston Common (1996, 1 episode) as Aubrey McLean
 Married... with Children (1987, 1996, 3 episodes) as Delbert in S2 E 1&2. 1996 as Cal Stevens
 Love's Deadly Triangle: The Texas Cadet Murder (1997) as Detective Carl Baker
 Caroline in the City (1997, 1 episode) as Earl
 [[Gone Fishin' (film)|Gone Fishin''']] (1997) as Phil Beasly
 Sabrina the Teenage Witch (1997, 1 episode) as Boyd
 JAG (1998, 1 episode) as Air Boss
 Touched by an Angel (1998, 1 episode) as Brother Jim
 ER (1998, 1 episode) as Emmet Chambliss
 Dr. Quinn, Medicine Woman (1998, 1 episode) as Clyde Hawkins
 The X-Files: Fight the Future (1998) as Fire Captain Cooles
 Will & Grace (1998–99, 11 episodes) as Harlin Polk
 Any Day Now (1999, 1 episode) as Bernie
 The Astronaut's Wife (1999) as Director Gerald McCleery

 2000s 

 Beverly Hills, 90210 (2000, 1 episode) as Borst
 Profiler (2000, 1 episode) as Ben Stillwell
 Python (2000) as Sheriff Griffin Wade
 Double Take (2001) as Timothy Jarret McReady
 Spring Break Lawyer (2001) as Senator Claxton
 Angel (2001–04, 4 episodes) as Roger Burkle
 NCIS (2003, 1 episode) as Dr. Elmo Poke
 Runaway Jury (2003) as Leon Dobbs
 One on One (2003, 1 episode) as Jack Crawford
 Ray (2004) as Billy Ray
 Glory Road (2006) as Coach Ralph Miller
 For One Night (2006) as Mr. Thornton
 Not Like Everyone Else (2006) as John Mack Butler
 All the King's Men (2006) as Sheriff Roebuck
 Prison Break (2006, 1 episode) as Senator Holston
 The Last Time (2006) as Toby Margolin
 Déjà Vu (2006) as Lt. Marquette
 The O.C. (2006–07, 6 episodes) as Gordon Bullit
 K-Ville (2007, 1 episode) as Medical Examiner
 Deal (2008) as Mr. Stillman
 My Mom's New Boyfriend (2008) as Police Chief Malone
 Private Valentine: Blonde & Dangerous (2008) as Captain Greer
 In the Electric Mist (2009) as Sheriff Gillis
 Maneater (2009) as Tripper Mason
 Bad Lieutenant: Port of Call New Orleans (2009) as the Chief of Police
 Alabama Moon (2009) as Judge Mackin

 2010s 

 Good Intentions (2010) as Zachary
 The Chameleon (2010) as John Striker
 Revenge of the Bridesmaids (2010) as Lou Wald
 Dirty Girl (2010) as Principal Mulray
 Wizards of Waverly Place (2010, 1 episode) as Pa
 Treme (2010–12, 4 episodes) as Richard Desaulet
 The Chaperone (2011) as Mr. Mobeleski
 Zeke and Luther (2011, 1 episode) as Jackson Cuplic
 Mardi Gras: Spring Break (2011) as Middle-aged Father
 Storm War (2011) as Colonel Neilson
 Bending the Rules (2011) as Clark Gunn
 Battleship (2012) as USAF Chief of Staff
 Hell and Mr. Fudge (2012) as Carl Ketcherside
 Common Law (2012, 12 episode) as Mr. Dumont
 No One Lives (2012) as Harris
 Criminal Minds (2012, 1 episode) as Detective Oren Carr
 Django Unchained (2012) as Bob Gibbs
 Bones (2013, 1 episode) as Dwayne Wilson
 Shadow People (2013) as CDC Director
 The Hot Flashes (2013) as the President of the Board
 Parkland (2013) as Dr. Kemp Clark
 Devil's Knot (2013) as Dale Griffis
 The Mentalist (2014, 1 episode) as Samuel Millman
 Sabotage (2014) as DEA Agent Lou Cantrell
 Wild Card (2014, 1 episode) as Jimmy Weaver
 Left Behind (2014) as Dennis Beese
 Murder in the First (2014–15, 2 episodes) as Richard Furdon
 Project Almanac (2015) as Doctor Lou
 Glee (2015, 1 episode) as Jimbo Wilson
 Convergence (2015) as Security Guard
 The Astronaut Wives Club (2015, 2 episodes) as Cal Butterfield
 Concussion (2015) as FBI Agent Owens
 Scream Queens (2015, 1 episode) as Mr. Swenson
 Free State of Jones (2016) as Prosecutor
 USS Indianapolis: Men of Courage (2016) as Judge Bazemore
 Demons (2017) as Father Joseph Moran
 Let There Be Light (2017) as Dr. Ray Fornier
 LBJ (2017) as Senator Everett Dirksen
 God Bless the Broken Road'' (2018)

Personal life
Grubbs resides in Hattiesburg, Mississippi, with his wife, Glenda, and their two children, Molly and Logan.

References

External links

1949 births
American male film actors
American male television actors
Living people
Male actors from Mississippi
People from Hattiesburg, Mississippi
People from Amory, Mississippi